Gerd Dais (born 11 August 1963) is a German football manager and former player.

References

External links
 
 

1963 births
Living people
German footballers
Association football midfielders
Karlsruher SC players
FC 08 Homburg players
SV Waldhof Mannheim players
SV Sandhausen players
VfR Mannheim players
Karlsruher SC II players
Bundesliga players
2. Bundesliga players
German football managers
2. Bundesliga managers
3. Liga managers
Stuttgarter Kickers managers
SV Sandhausen managers
SV Waldhof Mannheim managers
FC Nöttingen managers
Sportspeople from Heidelberg
Footballers from Baden-Württemberg